The 2007 Wake Forest Demon Deacons men's soccer team represented Wake Forest University during the 2007 NCAA Division I men's soccer season. It was the 28th season for the Demon Deacons, and their 28th in the Atlantic Coast Conference.

The 2007 season was the first, and so far only, season where the program won the NCAA Division I Men's Soccer Tournament, where they bested Ohio State in the championship match. The Deacons won the match 2-1, in a come-from behind victory. Wake Forest's Marcus Tracy tied the match in the 66th minute, while Zack Schilawski scored the match-winner in the 74th minute.

Background 

Wake Forest finished the 2006 season as the regular season co-champions alongside Duke. They were given the number two seed for the 2006 ACC Men's Soccer Tournament, in which they lost to Duke in the championship game 0–1. Despite the loss, the team earned a place in the 2006 NCAA Division I Men's Soccer Tournament as the two seed for an at-large bid. After beating Santa Clara in the quarterfinals, Wake Forest would go on to face UC Santa Barbara in the College Cup. However, they would lose to UC Santa Barbara 3–4 on penalties.

Review 
As of the 2018 NCAA Division I Men's Soccer Tournament, the 2007 title remains the only title won in Wake Forest program history. The team would have three players, Pat Phelan, Brian Edwards, and Julian Valentin, selected in the 2008 MLS SuperDraft, with Phelan picked in the first round.

Roster 
The following players played on the 2007 team.

Schedule

Preseason

Regular season

ACC Tournament

NCAA Tournament

College Cup

Statistics 
Players with no appearances not included in the list.

References

External links 
 2007 Men's Soccer Schedule

2007 Wake Forest
Wake Forest
2007 Wake Forest
NCAA Division I Men's Soccer Tournament-winning seasons
NCAA Division I Men's Soccer Tournament College Cup seasons
Wake Forest Demon Deacons men's soccer seasons